The women's points race at the 2022 Commonwealth Games, as part of the cycling programme, took place on 31 July 2022.

Schedule
The schedule was as follows:

All times are British Summer Time (UTC+1)

Results

Final
100 laps (25 km) were raced with 10 sprints.

References

Cycling at the Commonwealth Games – Women's points race
Women's points race
2022 in women's track cycling